A total solar eclipse occurred on January 3, 1908. A solar eclipse occurs when the Moon passes between Earth and the Sun, thereby totally or partly obscuring the image of the Sun for a viewer on Earth. A total solar eclipse occurs when the Moon's apparent diameter is larger than the Sun's, blocking all direct sunlight, turning day into darkness. Totality occurs in a narrow path across Earth's surface, with the partial solar eclipse visible over a surrounding region thousands of kilometres wide. Totality was visible from Ebon Atoll in German New Guinea (now in Marshall Islands), British Western Pacific Territories (the part now belonging to Kiribati), Line Islands (now in Kiribati), Phoenix Islands (now in Kiribati) on January 4 (Saturday), and Costa Rica on January 3 (Friday). The green line means eclipse begins or ends at sunrise or sunset. The magenta line means mid eclipse at sunrise or sunset, or northern or southern penumbra limits. The green point means eclipse obscuration of 50%. The blue line means umbral northern and southern limits.

Observations
The eclipse was observed by astronomer William Wallace Campbell of Lick Observatory, viewed from Flint Island, Kiribati:

Related eclipses

Solar eclipses 1906–1909

Saros 130

Inex series

Notes

References

 Photo of Solar Corona January 3, 1908

1908 01 03
1908 in science
1908 01 03
January 1908 events